Seetharam Benoy Case No. 18 is a 2021 Indian Kannada-language suspense thriller directed by Devi Prasad Shetty. The film released on 15 August 2021 on Star Suvarna.

Cast 
Vijay Raghavendra as Seetharam Benoy

Production 
The film was shot in Thirthahalli.

Reception 
Vinay Lokesh of The Times of India rated the film two-and-a-half out of five stars and wrote that "In his 50th film in the Kannada film industry, lead actor Vijay Raghavendra excels in his role as a cop, but the story could have been tighter for the edge-of-the-seat experience it was supposed to have been". Vivek M. V. of Deccan Herald stated that "It's tough to get emotionally attached to the lead character because his personal life is shoddily showcased. Perhaps due to budgetary constraints, the film is filled with fresh faces who struggle to hold our attention". Bobby Sing of The Free Press Journal wrote that "In all, it’s the sincere performance of Vijay and the technical merits that save the film from being a routine, below-average attempt. But the plot certainly deserved to be presented distinctively as an elaborate narration of just one case". Prathibha Joy of OTT Play opined that "Seetharam Benoy: Case No 18 gets off to a promising start, but falters along the way in execution".

References

External links 

 

2021 thriller films